Elias Ymer was the defending champion but lost in the first round to Lukáš Rosol.

Aljaž Bedene won the title after defeating Gastão Elias 7–6(7–4), 6–3 in the final.

Seeds

Draw

Finals

Top half

Bottom half

References
Main Draw
Qualifying Draw

Open Citta Della Disfida - Singles
2017 Singles